In Theosophy,  or  is an advanced spiritual entity and high-ranking member of a reputed hidden spiritual hierarchy, the Masters of the Ancient Wisdom. According to Theosophical doctrine, one of the hierarchy's functions is to oversee the evolution of humankind; in concert with this function Maitreya is said to hold the "Office of the World Teacher". Theosophical texts posit that the purpose of this Office is to facilitate the transfer of knowledge about the true constitution and workings of Existence to humankind. Humanity is thereby assisted on its presumed cyclical, but ever progressive, evolutionary path.

In  prominent Theosophists believed a reappearance of Maitreya was imminent. A suitable candidate for the entity's physical "vehicle" was identified as the then–adolescent Jiddu Krishnamurti, and the World Teacher Project was built around him for this purpose. The Project received worldwide publicity and interest, but also caused serious dissension and splits in the Theosophical Society. It was eventually dismantled in 1929 by Krishnamurti, who disavowed any further relationship with it and Theosophy in general.

The Theosophical concept of Maitreya has many similarities to the earlier Maitreya doctrine in Buddhism. However, they differ in important aspects. The Theosophical Maitreya has been assimilated or appropriated by a variety of quasi-Theosophical and non-Theosophical New Age and Esoteric groups and movements; they have advanced their own views on the entity's reappearance.

Development of the Theosophical concept of Maitreya
The first mention of Maitreya in a Theosophical context occurs in the 1883 work Esoteric Buddhism by Alfred Percy Sinnett (18401921), an early Theosophical writer. The concepts described by Sinnett were amended, elaborated and greatly expanded in The Secret Doctrine (published 1888), a major work by Helena Blavatsky (18311891), a founder of the Theosophical Society and of contemporary Theosophy. In it, the messianic Maitreya is linked to both Buddhist and Hindu religious traditions. In the same work Blavatsky stated that there have been, and will be, multiple messianic (or messianic-like) instances in human history. These successive appearances of "emissarie of Truth are according to Blavatsky part of the unceasing oversight of Earth and its inhabitants by a hidden spiritual hierarchy, the Masters of the Ancient Wisdom.

Maitreya and the spiritual hierarchy

Following Blavatsky's writings on the subject other Theosophists progressively elaborated on the reputed spiritual hierarchy. Its members are presented as guardians and guides of Earth's total evolutionary process, known in Theosophical cosmology as the doctrine of Planetary Rounds. In Theosophy, evolution includes an occult or spiritual component that is considered more important than the related physical evolution. The hierarchy is said to consist of spiritual entities at various evolutionary stages; lower ranks are populated by individuals who can function more or less normally on the physical plane, while the highest known positions are occupied by beings of the purest spiritual essence and consciousness.

According to the later Theosophical texts, Maitreya's position in the current stage of planetary evolution is that of the Boddhisatva, originally a Buddhist concept. Since this position is thought to be at an exalted state, Maitreya may have no direct or sustained contact with the physical realm. At this evolutionary level he is reputedly below only two others in the current hierarchy: at its apex, the Sanat Kumara (referred to as "The Lord of the World"), followed by the Buddha. Maitreya is additionally described as having among other duties overall responsibility for humanity's development including its education, civilization and religion.

Blavatsky had stated that certain members of the hierarchy, often called "the Masters" or "the Mahātmās" in Theosophical literature, were the ultimate guides of the Theosophical Society. The Society itself was said to be the result of one of the hierarchy's regular "impulses" to help Humankind's evolution. Blavatsky further commented in her 1889 work The Key to Theosophy about the next impulse, the "effort of the th century" which would involve another "torch bearer of Truth". In this effort the Theosophical Society was poised to possibly play a major role. More information regarding the future impulse was the purview of the Theosophical Society's Esoteric Section, which was founded by Blavatsky and was originally led by her. Its members had access to occult instruction and more detailed knowledge of the inner order and mission of the Society and of its reputed hidden guides.

Maitreya and the Christ Principle
Blavatsky also elaborated on a "Christ Principle", which in her view corresponds to the spiritual essence of every human being. After her death in 1891 influential Theosophist Charles Webster Leadbeater (18541934), whose knowledge on occult matters was highly respected by the Society's leadership, formulated a Christology that identified Christ with the Theosophical representation of the Buddhist deity Maitreya. He wrote that an aspect of Maitreya was the prototype for the Christ Principle described by Blavatsky. Leadbeater believed that Maitreya-as-Christ had previously manifested on Earth, often through specially prepared people who acted as the entity's "vehicles". The manifested Maitreya then assumed the role of World Teacher, dispensing knowledge regarding underlying truths of Existence. This knowledge, which according to Theosophists eventually crystallized in religious, scientific and cultural practices, had been reputedly disseminated to groups as small as a few carefully selected Initiates and as large as Humanity as a whole.

Maitreya's manifestations
In Theosophical texts, Maitreya is said to have had numerous manifestations or incarnations: in the theorized ancient continent of Atlantis; as a Hierophant in Ancient Egypt; as the Hindu deity Krishna; as a high priest in Ancient India; and as Christ during the three years of the Ministry of Jesus.

Maitreya's reappearance
Annie Besant (18471933), another well-known and influential Theosophist (and future President of the Society) had also developed an interest in this area of Theosophy. In the decades of the 1890s and 1900s, along with Leadbeater (eventually a close associate) and others, she became progressively convinced that the next impulse from the hierarchy would happen sooner than Blavatsky's timetable; these Theosophists came to believe it would involve the imminent reappearance of Maitreya as World Teacher, a monumental event in the Theosophical scheme of things. Besant had started commenting on the possible imminent arrival of the next emissary in 1896, several years before her assumption of the Society's presidency in 1907. By 1909 the "coming Teacher" was a main topic of her lectures and writings.

After Besant became President of the Society the belief in Maitreya's imminent manifestation took on considerable weight. The subject was widely discussed and became a commonly held expectation among Theosophists. However, not all Theosophical Society members accepted Leadbeater's and Besant's ideas on the matter; the dissidents charged them with straying from Theosophical orthodoxy and, along with other concepts developed by the two, the writings on Maitreya were derisively labeled Neo-Theosophy by their opponents. The Adyar (Chennai)-based international leadership of the Society eventually overcame the protests and by the late-1920s the organization had stabilized, but in the meantime additional World Teacher-related trouble was brewing.

World Teacher Project

In 1909 Leadbeater encountered fourteen-year-old Jiddu Krishnamurti (18951986) near the Theosophical Society headquarters at Adyar, and came to believe the boy was a suitable candidate for the "vehicle" of the expected World Teacher. Soon after, he placed Krishnamurti under his and the Society's care. In  Besant, by then President of the Society and head of its Esoteric Section, admitted Krishnamurti into both; in  she became his legal guardian. Krishnamurti was subsequently groomed extensively for his expected role as the probable World Teacher, and a new organization, the Order of the Star in the East (OSE), was formed in 1911 to support him in this mission. The project received widespread publicity, and enjoyed worldwide following (mainly among Theosophists). It also faced opposition within and without the Theosophical Society, and led to years of upheaval, serious splits within the Society, and doctrinal schisms in Theosophy. The German Section, led by Rudolf Steiner, seceded from the Society and was eventually reorganized as the Anthroposophical Society. Additional negative repercussions occurred in 1929, when Krishnamurti repudiated the role the Theosophists expected him to fulfill, dissolved the Order of the Star and completely disassociated himself from the World Teacher Project; soon after he severed ties with the Society and Theosophy in general. These events reputedly prompted Leadbeater to declare, "the Coming  has gone wrong", and damaged Theosophical organizations and the overall standing of Theosophy.

Later concepts of Maitreya
Following the Krishnamurti debacle, major Theosophical organizations and writers became increasingly muted, at least publicly, on the subject of the reappearance of Maitreya and the possible next impulse of the reputed spiritual hierarchy. However the concepts of World Teacher, of a hidden spiritual hierarchy, and of masters of occult wisdom continued to have supporters. Some were Theosophical Society members, but increasingly such beliefs were found among near-Theosophical and non-Theosophical New Age adherents.

Alice A. Bailey

A major proponent was Alice Bailey (18801949), who left the Theosophical Society in the 1920s to establish the quasi-Theosophical Arcane School. She expanded Leadbeater's work and his Christology, and referred to Maitreya as the "Cosmic Christ", stating his Second Coming would occur sometime after the year 2025.

Ascended Master Teachings
The Theosophical Maitreya holds a prominent position in the Ascended Master Teachings. These encompass original Theosophical literature as well as later additions and interpretations by various non-Theosophical commentators and groupssuch as the I AM Activity and Elizabeth Clare Prophet (19392009). However, the validity of such later commentary has been disputed by Theosophical writers.

Benjamin Creme

Benjamin Creme (19222016), a follower of Alice Bailey and founder of Share International, an organization whose doctrines have similarities with those of mainstream Theosophy, is a later promoter of Maitreya. In 1975 Creme stated that he had started to telepathically channel Maitreya. The latter reputedly communicated to Creme that he had decided to return to Earth earlier than 2025. Creme made a number of extraordinary statements and predictions based on reputed telepathic messages from Maitreya that failed to come true; as a result he had been considered a figure of amusement in the press.

Notes

References

 

 

 

 

 

 

 

 

 

 

 

 

 

 

 

 

 

 

  .

 

 

 

  .

Further reading

 

 According to this author, "the Masters" as described by Blavatsky were idealized depictions of her human mentors. The Great White Lodge is related to the Theosophical spiritual hierarchy.

 In same, see also "Section 18" .

Ascended Master Teachings
Maitreya
Masters of the Ancient Wisdom
Messianism